Yu Xihe Shuang (aka Yu Xihe or Yu Lunas) is a Filipino-Chinese model, singer and actress. She is most well known for her role as Jules in  Flores de la Pasion .

Early life
Yu was raised in Luzon, wherein she is rumoured to have both parents who are both artists. At an early age, Yu took up dancing and has learned to play various instruments as a child. Her first instrument was the violin, followed by the guitar and the piano. When she was young she practiced ballet but, instead had moved toward Taekwando and eventually Muay Thai as she grew older.
Currently Yu is a college student.

Career

Modeling
Yu started out as a cosplayer; she attended various cosplay, anime, and gaming events such as Ozine fest, Otakufest, Comicon, BoA, and ESGS. She was seen to have started around the years 2012 and up until, 2016 Yu has cosplayed famous characters such as Ling Xiaoyu  from the popular game Tekken .
Aside from her cosplay career, she has been a freelance model.

Acting
Yu’s acting career started when she was in high school. She played the role of Oedipus the King  in the drama Oedipus Rex  at SCPS of Literary Class Theatre. After playing the main role in the drama, she has been involved in various theatre plays until it eventually led her to act in movies.

Her breakthrough came in the 2015 in suspense crime investigation movie Flores de la Pasion, based on the 2015 Flores de Passion(book).  It acquired very high viewership ratings, and raised Yu's profile.

In 2016, she starred as a supporting character in dj, another crime investigation movie. In this year, another movie which is  The Paranoid and the Flyer  was released with Yu starring as one of the main roles as the Flyer.

It was also announced in 2016 that Yu will star in another movie, Kaleidoscope, as Freya Kropek. She was also chosen for the role of Chinese TV series drama Dear Princess, My Princess which has started shooting since late 2016.

Filmography

Movies

References

Living people
Filipino stage actresses
1997 births
Filipino film actresses
Cosplayers
Filipina gravure idols
Filipino people of Chinese descent
Actresses from Manila
Singers from Manila
21st-century Filipino singers